Yến Lê Espiritu is an American sociologist. She is the author of Home Bound: Filipino American Lives across Cultures, Communities, and Countries. Her research focuses on immigration and refugee studies, Southeast Asian Studies, transnationalism, Asian
American Studies, and US Militarism. Originally from Vietnam, Espiritu is the Distinguished Professor of Ethnic Studies at University of California, San Diego. She is also a founding faculty of the Critical Refugee Studies Collective.

Education and academic career 
Espiritu graduated from UC San Diego in 1985 with a B.A. in communications. She continued to receive a M.A. in sociology in 1987 from University of California, Los Angeles and a Ph.D. in sociology in 1990 from the same institution. She has taught at the Department of Ethnic Studies at UC San Diego since 1990 and has chaired the department for four times.

Awards 
Espiritu's Asian American Panethnicity: Bridging Institutions and Identities has won the 1994 Association for Asian American Studies (AAAS) Book Award. Her Home Bound: Filipino American Lives across Cultures, Communities, and Countries has won the 2005 AAAS Book Award in Social Sciences. She has been awarded the Excellence in Mentoring Award by AAAS in 2012.

Works

References 

American sociologists
Women sociologists
University of California, San Diego faculty
Year of birth missing (living people)
Living people